The Legend of King Naresuan is a Thai biographical historical drama film series about King Naresuan the Great, who ruled Siam from 1590 until his death in 1605.

The films are directed by Chatrichalerm Yukol and are a followup to his 2003 film, The Legend of Suriyothai. The films were released in the U.S. under the titles Kingdom of War.

 The Legend of King Naresuan The Great, Part I, Hongsawadee's Hostage, was released on January 18, 2007.
 The Legend of King Naresuan The Great, Part II, Reclaiming Sovereignty, was released on February 15, 2007.
 The Legend of King Naresuan The Great, Part III, Naval Battle, was released on March 31, 2011.
 The Legend of King Naresuan The Great, Part IV, The Nanda Bayin War, was released on August 11, 2011.
 The Legend of King Naresuan The Great, Part V, Elephant Battle, was released on May 29, 2014.
 The Legend of King Naresuan The Great, Part VI, The end of Hong Sa, was released on April 9, 2015.

Part I deals with Naresuan's boyhood, when he was taken hostage by Burmese King, Bayinnaung to keep the vassal Ayutthaya Kingdom subservient. During this time, he was a novice Buddhist monk under the tutelage of a wise father-figure monk (Sorapong Chatree). Part II depicts Naresuan as a young adult prince, already a formidable military strategist, as he leads his army on exploits against breakaway kingdoms for King Bayinnaung's successor, King Nonthabureng, and eventually breaks away to declare sovereignty for Siam. Part III was to depict Naresuan's military and leadership skills and the expansion of the Siamese kingdom.

In production for more than three years, the project has an estimated budget of 700 million baht, making it the most expensive Thai film made.

As King of Fire, part II was selected as Thailand's submission  to the 80th Academy Awards for Best Foreign Language Film.

Plot

Part I: Hongsawadee's Hostage
The film concerns the childhood of King Naresuan. Born in 1555, he was taken to Burma as a child hostage; there he became acquainted with sword fighting and became a threat to the Burmese empire

The film begins in 1564, during the Burmese siege of Phitsanulok, the center of the languishing Sukhothai kingdom. Naresuan's father, Maha Thammarachathirat, admits defeat and follows Burmese orders that his two sons, Naresuan (nicknamed Ong Dam  Black Prince) and Ekathotsarot (the White Prince), be taken hostage and be raised in Pegu (the center of the Hanthawadi kingdom) under the watchful eyes of Bayinnaung, the Burmese king, who promises to care for Naresuan like one of his own. This creates a rift between Naresuan's father and his mother, Queen Wisutkasat, whose brother is the king of the neighboring Ayutthaya kingdom, as Phitsanulok is now a Burmese vassal state. Ayutthaya falls soon after.

Immediately after entering the Burmese palace, Naresuan sees the palace politics and rivalries between himself and Bayinnaung's grandson, Mingyi Swa. Naresuan is sent to be educated as a novice monk, by an ethnic Mon Buddhist monk named Khanchong, at a Buddhist monastery outside the palace. There, while wandering the Thai village outside Pegu (made up of Thais displaced by Bayinnaung's expansionist campaigns and subsequent forced relocations to Hanthawadi), he befriends a Mon street child who is later allowed to work as a temple boy called Bunthing (later became Mon leader Lord Rachamanu). He also befriends Maneechan, a temple girl at the monastery. The monk Khanchong, who had also trained Bayinnaung, teaches Naresuan the skills of war and ethics.

Part II: Reclaiming Sovereignty

Bayinnaung dies in the beginning of the film from natural causes. Thammaracha, the governor-king of Ayutthaya, believes it is important that he go and pay respect to the dead king out of fear that the new Burmese king Nanda would deem it as an insult and attack Ayutthaya. Prince Naresuan, however, having been raised in Pegu (the kingdom of Hanthawadi) and who regards Bayinnaung as a second father, convinces Thammaracha to let him go in his place.

Upon arriving in Hanthawadi (Hongsawadi in Thai), Naresuan's childhood teacher, a Buddhist monk named Khan Chong, informs him about the dangers that king Nanda and many factions in Burma are plotting his assassination. At king Bayinnaung's funeral, all representatives from vassal kingdoms are present besides for one, the Krang kingdom.  King Nanda sees it as disrespect and seizes the opportunity to wage war and siege the mountain top city.  Naresuan's Ayutthaya army is successful in taking the mountain top city and proves itself superior to the rival Burmese armies, namely of the Lord of Pyay and of Mingyi Swa (the eldest son of Nandabayin).  Burmese rivals felt even more threatened by the strength and wits of Naresuan's army. During the battle, Naresuan's friend, Bunthing, now a highly skilled general under Naresuan, falls for the princess of Krang, who becomes his companion.

A plot is uncovered by Naresuan's childhood friends, two Mon rulers, that the Burmese are in fact planning the assassination of Naresuan.  Upon finding out, Naresuan executes the plotters and ceremoniously declares Ayutthaya free and sovereign from Hanthawadi. King Nanda and his Burmese are furious and begin a military campaign to capture and kill king Naresuan before his forces and liberated Siamese subjects can reach the Sittaung River. King Naresuan uses the strategy of a fighting retreat.  His forces built a wooden bridge across the river and engage the pursuing Burmese army as they follow.  Several battles took place during the crossing. However, as the Burmese forces catch up, the Siamese citizens and forces have already crossed to the other bank.

The Burmese, determined to defeat the Siamese, try to pursue Naresuan's forces by crossing the river. The king is then approached by his revered Buddhist teacher, Mon monk Khanchong.  Here, he is given a special musket, which is capable of firing across the river.  According to history, the movie portrays king Naresuan firing the musket across the Sittaung River, and with one strike, killing the general of the Burmese army. With the general dead, Burmese forces retreated back to Hanthawadi.  King Naresuan and his now independent Siamese forces head back to Ayutthaya and the king declares ; "It's not over yet, there is more work for us to do!"

Part III: Naval Battle
In 1584 at Kraeng, King Naresuan continues the war for independence of the Kingdom of Ayutthaya (Thai : อาณาจักรอยุธยา). The war began because King Nanda bayin king of the Burmese Kingdom (Thai : อาณาจักรพม่า) had secretly determined to fight a war by sending two armies to attack King Naresuan.  The first army is that of Lord Pathein which passes through the Three Pagodas Pass (Thai: ด่านเจดีย์สามองค์).  The second army is that of the King Noratra Mangsosri (Thai : นรธาเมงสอ) of Lanna (Chiang Mai) which attacks from the north of the Kingdom of Ayutthaya. The Lanna army halts and builds a camp at BanSraKet (Thai : บ้านสระเกศ). While two armies are preparing for continuing the war with Ayutthaya, the King of Lovek (Thai : ละแวก) sends Lord Jinjantu (Thai : จินจันตุ), a Chinese official, to spy in Ayutthaya, but a short time later, he heads back to Lovek because king Naresuan knows that he is a spy. After an intense river battle between Jinjantu's Chinese troops and the Siamese gunboats under Naresuan's personal command, he is able to escape.

When the King of Lovek learns about the skills and abilities of Naresuan, he decides to make an alliance with Ayutthaya by sending his reluctant brother, Prince Srisuphanrachathirat (Thai: พระศรีสุพรรณราชาธิราช) to help Ayutthaya fight against Hanthawadi (Thai : หงสาวดี). While Naresuan prepares for the war, he realizes that the soldiers in the army of Ayutthaya are outnumbered by the two armies of Burma, so he decides to fight with each army separately before the two armies come together. First he fights with army of Lord Pathein west of Ayutthaya and he wins this first battle.  Then he fights with the army north of Ayutthaya. After a hard-fought battle, King Naresun defeats the army of King Norata Mangsosri of Lanna. After King Nanda Bayin finish the war with Inn Wa (Thai : อังวะ), he back to war with Ayuthaya. Finally, King Naresuan can keep the independence of Ayuthaya.

Part IV: The Nanda Bayin War
Naresuan is injured trying to storm a Burmese camp. His advisors told him to avoid direct contact with enemy troops but he ignores and climb the ladder. He initially slays a few Burmese soldiers before the Burmese camp commander stabs him with a spear.

Nanda Bayin orders his son, Mingyi Swa to eliminate King Naresuan, saying that he doesn't care what losses the Burmese suffer. They must take down the king so that the Siamese forces would be easier to defeat.

The Burmese send their army to defeat Siam but were unsuccessful.

Part V: Elephant Battle

Nanda Bayin was humiliated by his crushing defeats by King Naresuan. He sent his son Mingyi Swa with an army to attack Ayutthaya. Naresuan planned the battle with his generals and came up with a decision to fight at Nong Sarai. The larger Burmese force under Mingy Swa was faced with a smaller army by King Naresuan. Naresuan calls Mingyi Swa for an elephant duel. Fearing humiliation of his royalty, he accepts the duel. Ekathosarot also duels with Chaophraya Chaiyanuphap. Naresuan and Mingyi Swa fought in the middle of an open field. Naresuan was cut in his helmet, but managed to continue fighting and was able to slay Mingyi Swa. Ekathosarot also slays Chaophraya Chaiyanuphap. The Burmese army soon retreats from Siam. This will be the last Burmese invasion that Nanda Bayin will have ordered. After his victory, Naresuan planned to order the execution of all his soldiers that didn't participate in the fight with him, but he was convinced by Khanchong, his childhood monk teacher to not have them executed and sent to fight Burma.

Part VI: The end of Hong Sa 
Naresuan receives news from a Burmese deserter that the Burmese king Nanda Bayin, enraged over the loss of his son, had ordered the deaths of most of the military leaders in his Army, on the grounds that they had 'let his son die'. There was also news that, in his rage, Nanda Bayin had also killed off Suphankalaya, Naresuan's older sister. This angers the King, and he quickly announces his intention to gather an army, capture Pegu, and burn it to the ground as revenge. Nanda Bayin was met by the viceroy of Toungoo and was requested to leave Pegu and retreat to Toungoo. The Lord of Pyay marched his army to loot the city. The city was later sacked by the Arakans. When Naresuan reached the city, he saw the once glorious city in ruins. His generals advised him that supply lines are stretched thin and he could march up to catch Nanda Bayin, but Naresuan insisted that the Siamese army can use Mawlamyine to supply. The Siamese army marched up to Toungoo. Toungoo was besieged by the Siamese army after the viceroy of Toungoo refused to hand over Nanda Bayin. Natshinnaung the prince of Toungoo didn't enjoy Nanda Bayin's presence in the city so he got into an agreement with Naresuan. He would allow Naresuan to get into the palace of Toungoo and execute Nanda Bayin. Nanda Bayin crossed the moats of the city and entered Nanda Bayin's chamber. Nanda Bayin then admits his guilt to Naresuan and shows his burnt face. Naresuan then spares Nanda Bayin and takes the Siamese army back to Ayutthaya. Natshinnaung later assassinates Nanda Bayin by poisoning him. Naresuan arrives back to Ayutthaya to tell his monk that we will retire and be a monk. His brother Ekathosarot would ascend to the throne.

Cast
 Wanchana Sawatdee as King Naresuan
 Pratcha Sananvatananont as Prince Naresuan (youth)
 Napatsakorn Mitr-em as Crown Prince Minchit Sra
 Nopachai Jayanama as Rachamanu (Bunting)
 Taksaorn Paksukcharern as Manechan
 Chatchai Plengpanich as King Thamaracha
 Grace Mahadumrongkul as Princess Supankulayanee
 Intira Jaroenpura as Lurkin
 Sompob Benjatikul as King Bayinnaung
 Jakkrit Amarat as Nanda Bayin
 Sorapong Chatree as Mahathera Khanchong
Santisuk Promsiri as King Mahinthrathirat
 Saranyu Wongkrajang as King Chakrapadi
 Winthai Suvaree as Prince Ekathotsarot
Dom Hetrakul as Prince Hanfa
 Jirayu La-ongmanee as Bunting (youth)
 Suchada Chekly as Manechan (youth)
 Manop Aswathep as Lord Sawankhalok
Krung Sriwilai as Lord Phichai
 Chumphorn Thepphithak as King of Kung

Production

Special effects
Production on The Legend of King Naresuan began in 2003 on a purpose-built set in Kanchanaburi Province.

Looking for advice on costuming and special effects, Chatrichalerm had met in Bangkok with director Baz Luhrmann, who advised the Thai director to get in contact with Peter Jackson and observe him making King Kong. Through Jackson, Chatrichalerm met with people from the Weta Workshop and worked out a trade of knowledge, in which the New Zealand effects artists would share techniques for making light armor while learning from Thai craftsmen about gold jewellery making. New tools and equipment have been made, the production crew were sent to training abroad, and the experts in the industry from such movies as “Troy,” “The Lord of the Rings,” and “Anaconda” have been working as the consultants and supervisors of the production of “Naresuan.” The experts have tremendously conveyed various techniques in movie making and assisted in training to equip the Thai crew members with the knowledge and skills necessary to produce quality movies and to enable them to develop to their fullest potential to raise the status of the film industry in Thailand to be equal to leading film industries in the western world in the near future.

Film Location
Based on the film website, the location covers the area of approximately 2,000 rai in the compound of Surasee Military Base in Kanchanaburi Province to be in compliance with the historical records specifying that various major incidents in the life of King Naresuan took place in this province. In addition to historical significance, the location is appropriate and the production has received tremendous support from the Royal Thai Army, providing access to the location, manpower, as well as equipment and tools necessary for the completion of the construction of the sound stages.

Casting
Actor Wanchana Sawatdee, in his feature film debut as Naresuan, is a cavalry officer in the Royal Thai Army with the rank of captain. Chatrichalerm said he cast a newcomer in the role "to avoid any possible negative image."

"The king is also a brave warrior, so Captain Wanchana, a professional cavalry soldier with a macho look, was a perfect fit for the character."

Grace Mahadumrongkul, who portrays Naresuan's sister, Supankulayanee, was cast in the role in 2006. Previously, she was a presenter on Thai television Channel 5.

Other roles include King Bayinnaung, who is portrayed by Sompop Benjatikul, and the Buddhist monk,  Mahathera Khanchong, portrayed by Sorapong Chatree. Both are veteran actors who have worked with Chatrichalerm before.

Reception

Part I
King Naresuan Part I: Hongsawadee's Hostage, grossed more than 100 million baht on its opening weekend, despite some production problems with the film. After a world premiere screening on January 16, director Chatrichalerm Yukol continued to edit the film. On opening day, January 18, 2007, prints of the film were still not ready for wide distribution, and were delivered late in the day in Bangkok cinemas and screenings were canceled in the provinces.

Part I received mixed reviews in the local media. The Bangkok Post said the film was "torn between the need to be a serious historical movie and popular entertainment for the masses." But The Nation called it "a beautiful movie, planned to meticulous detail with the exotic designs and colors of the royal dresses, golden palaces and exotic temples." The Nation also hosted a forum for readers to comment on the film.

Part II
King Naresuan Part II: Reclamation of Sovereignty, premiered in a wide theatrical release in Thailand on February 15, 2007. The #1 film at the Thailand box office for several weeks, it earned US$7 million.

Critical reception was more favorable than the first installment. Kong Rithdee of the Bangkok Post said: "Surprise, surprise: Naresuan II is good fun. The pacing crisp, the acting passionate, the warfare intense."

Jeerawat Na Talang, columnist for The Nation, wrote on her blog: "This is simply the best Thai film I have seen in years ... Compared to the first one, the sequel is better such as in terms of cast and editing."

Submitted as King of Fire, Part II was Thailand's entry  to the 80th Academy Awards for Best Foreign Language Film.

Part II was also the opening film at the 2007 Cinemanila International Film Festival, and both films were screened out of competition in the Thai Panorama section of the 2007 Bangkok International Film Festival.

Television series

On 9 January 2017, a television series titled The Legend of King Naresuan: The Series was released, broadcast by Mono 29 in Thailand. The series is directed by Chalermchatri Yukol, the son of the films' director. The television series has a storyline that isn't significantly different from the film.

References
 Rithee, Kong. July 14, 2006. "Siamese Saga", Bangkok Post, Real Time, Page R1 (retrieved via Buzz Net on October 28, 2006).
 Ahantharik, Chaiwat. January 17, 2007. Review: King Naresuan, Monsters & Critics (retrieved on January 18, 2007).

Notes

External links

 www.kingnaresuanmovie.com
 
 
 (Thai) Production photos at Deknang
 The star of Siam's history at Asia Times Online

2007 films
2000s biographical films
Thai biographical films
Cultural depictions of Thai monarchs
Films set in the 1560s
Films set in the 1580s
Films set in Thailand
Films set in Myanmar
Sahamongkol Film International films
Biographical action films
2000s historical action films
Thai-language films
Epic films based on actual events
War epic films
Films released in separate parts
Historical epic films
Films scored by Richard Harvey
Thai historical action films
History of Thailand in fiction
Cockfighting in film